Edwards Run Wildlife Management Area is located on  two miles (3 km) north of Capon Bridge on Cold Stream Road (County Route 15) near Cold Stream in Hampshire County, West Virginia. Edwards Run WMA is owned by the West Virginia Division of Natural Resources.

White-tailed deer, turkey, quail, squirrel, rabbit, and grouse hunting opportunities are available in the wildlife management area. A section of Edwards Run and a  lake, Edwards Pond, provide fishing for smallmouth and largemouth bass, sunfish, bluegill, and channel catfish. Edwards Run and Pond are also stocked with trout February through March and in October. The stream on the WMA is a designated catch and release trout stream. A primitive camping area is in proximity to Edwards Pond and pit toilets and trash receptacles are provided. A nominal camping fee is charged by the WVDNR.

See also
Edwards Run
Animal conservation
Fishing
Hunting
List of West Virginia wildlife management areas

References

External links
West Virginia DNR District 2 Wildlife Management Areas

Wildlife management areas of West Virginia
Protected areas of Hampshire County, West Virginia
IUCN Category V